Rowland Kenney (1882-1961) was a British diplomat, propagandist, author and editor. During World War I and World War II, Kenney directed British propaganda in Norway and Scandinavia.

Kenney was born on 28 December 1882 in Shelderslow, Saddleworth, West Riding of Yorkshire, now part of Oldham District. Son of Horatio Nelson Kenney (1849-1912), a cotton-mill worker, and his Ann Kenney (née Wood, 1852–1905), Kenney was the brother of suffragette Annie Kenney. In his youth and early adulthood, Kenney worked a series of manual labor jobs, before taking up work as a salesman, and joining the Shop Assistants' Union and the Independent Labour Party. His work in various socialist organizations led him to become a journalist and later an editor of the Daily Herald, and briefly, a publisher of Vanity Fair.

Kenney married Dano-Norwegian Asta Ingrid Brockdorff (1883-1947) in 1911, and spent some time in Norway before the onset of the First World War. In 1916, with war raging in Europe, Kenney was recommended to the Foreign Office as an agent who could assess the propaganda situation in Norway. Having drawn up a report, Kenney was subsequently offered the position as Press Attaché in the British Legation (now Embassy) in Norway's capital Christiania (now Oslo). As Press Attaché, Kenney made contact with Norwegian editors and publishers and under cover of being a Reuters correspondent, supplied Norwegian media with British propaganda. He was also instrumental in reshaping the Norwegian Telegram Bureau (NTB) to separate it from its German influence.

After World War I, Kenney, still working for the Foreign Office, travelled to Poland to assess the political situation and reported back to the British delegation at Versailles. Returning from Versailles to England in 1918, Kenney suffered a plane crash and survived with lasting injuries. He continued in the inter-war years to work for various government institutions tied to the Foreign Office. In particular, he was a key player in the establishment of the British Council. During this time, he wrote his autobiography Westering, published in 1939.

As World War II loomed in 1939, Kenney was sent back to Oslo, again as Press Attaché. His mission was the same as in World War I, but it was cut short by the German invasion of Norway in April 1940. Fleeing Oslo, Kenney found himself in a small contingent of British diplomats and the intelligence officer Frank Foley. They made their escape to Åndalsnes. During this time, Kenney connected with Norwegian officials seeking to establish Allied news services in Norway, as well as the Norwegian officer Martin Linge, who would later become a leader in the Norwegian resistance movement. Evacuated to Great Britain, Kenney continued to work to provide Norway and the Scandinavian countries with Allied news and propaganda. In 1942, he was seconded to the Norwegian Government-in-Exile and was later awarded the Order of St Olav for his work.

After the war, Kenney returned briefly to Norway as a diplomat, and published The Northern Tangle, a history of Scandinavia. He died in 1961, survived by his only child, Kit Kenney (1913-1988).

References 

1882 births
1961 deaths
People from the Metropolitan Borough of Oldham
20th-century British newspaper publishers (people)
British magazine editors
20th-century British diplomats
British expatriates in Norway
British people of World War I
British people of World War II